German submarine U-774 was a Type VIIC U-boat of Nazi Germany's Kriegsmarine during World War II.

She was ordered on 21 November 1940, and was laid down on 17 December 1942, at Kriegsmarinewerft, Wilhelmshaven, as yard number 157. She was launched on 23 December 1943, and commissioned under the command of Oberleutnant zur See Johann Buttjer on 17 February 1944.

Design
German Type VIIC submarines were preceded by the shorter Type VIIB submarines. U-774 had a displacement of  when at the surface and  while submerged. She had two shafts and two  propellers.

U-774 was fitted with five  torpedo tubes (four fitted at the bow and one at the stern), fourteen torpedoes or 26 TMA mines, one  SK C/35 naval gun, (220 rounds), one  Flak M42 and two twin  C/30 anti-aircraft guns. The boat had a complement of between 44 — 52 men.

Service history
U-774 participated in one war patrol that yielded no ships sunk or damaged.

Kapitänleutnant Werner Sausmikat and all 43 crewmen were lost.

References

Bibliography

External links

German Type VIIC submarines
U-boats commissioned in 1944
World War II submarines of Germany
Ships built in Wilhelmshaven
1943 ships
Maritime incidents in April 1945
World War II shipwrecks in the Atlantic Ocean
U-boats sunk by British warships
U-boats sunk by depth charges